Elland is a market town in Calderdale, in the county of West Yorkshire, England. It is situated south of Halifax, by the River Calder and the Calder and Hebble Navigation. Elland was recorded as Elant in the Domesday Book of 1086. It had a population in 2001 of 14,554, with the ward being measured at 11,676 in the 2011 Census.

Etymology
The name of Elland is attested in the 1086 Domesday Book as Elant. The name comes from the Old English words ēa ('river') and land ('land'); the name relates to the settlement's location on the south bank of the Calder.

History

Elland retained continuity of tenure from before the Norman Conquest into the Middle Ages, as the Elland family were descended from Anglo-Saxon thegns. The Manor of Elland, with Greetland and Southowram, formed an exclave of the Honour of Pontefract in the surrounding Manor of Wakefield. In 1350 Sir John de Eland was murdered, as were his son and grandson in the following year, which extinguished the male line of the family and the manor passed to the Savile family. From this period, the manor house ceased to be the principal dwelling of a gentry family, as the Saviles had their seat at the moated manor of Thornhill. Elland manor house was never completely reconstructed and, when dismantled and excavated in 1975 by the West Yorkshire Archaeology Unit, it was found to incorporate a 13th-century solar wing – one of the earliest secular buildings in the county. The manor house stood on a knoll aligned with the bridge over the River Calder and was destroyed during the construction of Calderdale Way bypass. The farm buildings survive.

At the request of John de Warenne, 7th Earl of Surrey, Edward II granted a charter, to John de Eland, for a free market on Tuesday at his Manor of Elland, and two fairs.

The town became a centre of wool production. The decline of the woollen industry had a significant effect on the town and many mills were demolished or converted to residences.

Durable flagstones, Elland flags, were quarried near the town and after the canal was constructed, they could be transported economically all over the county. Elland housed the main factory of the manufacturer of Gannex products and is the home of the Dobsons sweet factory, which produces traditional boiled sweets. Since 2001, Elland has been home to Suma Wholefoods, the largest workers' co-operative in the United Kingdom.

Governance
Elland was historically a township, with Greetland, in the large ancient parish of Halifax. The township became a civil parish in 1866, but in 1894 Elland was separated from Greetland and became Elland Urban District (and civil parish). In 1937 Greetland and Stainland were added to the Urban District. In 1974 the urban district and civil parish were abolished and merged into Calderdale Metropolitan Borough.

Landmarks 

Buildings of interest include the parish church of St Mary the Virgin, the former Rose and Crown Inn in Northgate, Elland Town Hall, Southgate Methodist Church, the reputedly haunted Fleece Inn at the top of Westgate, the Rex Cinema and Waxman ceramics on Elland Lane. The remains of the medieval stocks can be found at the junction of Southgate and Elizabeth Street. The stocks, which are grade II listed, date from the late 17th, or early 18th century.

Elland Power Station

Elland Power Station was a coal-fired power station by the River Calder.  It was decommissioned and closed in 1991, in keeping with the trend of generating power at fewer but larger power stations away from towns, and demolished in 1996.

Transport
The Calder and Hebble Navigation opened in the late-18th century to serve the growing industrialisation of the Calder Valley. Elland railway station closed in 1962 but the line is still in use as a passenger service for the Caldervale Line.

As of March 2023 planning approval for the new station has been granted, with building work due to begin in 2024 and an estimated completion date of 2025. 

The A643 road begins in Leeds and ended in Elland. It passes Leeds United AFC's football ground, Elland Road. It now ends at junction 23 of the M62 motorway.

Notable people
Thomas Thornton (1922–1987), first-class cricketer

See also
 Ellands, a surname
 Elland (UK Parliament constituency)
 Listed buildings in Elland

References

 
Towns in West Yorkshire
Market towns in West Yorkshire
Unparished areas in West Yorkshire
Former civil parishes in West Yorkshire
Geography of Calderdale
Wards of Calderdale